Taverne d'Arbia is a village in Tuscany, central Italy, administratively a frazione of the comune of Siena, province of Siena. At the time of the 2001 census, its population was 2,366.

Taverne d'Arbia is about 8 km from Siena.

References 

Frazioni of Siena